The 2012–13 Gonzaga Bulldogs women's basketball team is representing Gonzaga University in the 2012–13 college basketball season. The Bulldogs (also informally referred to as the "Zags"), members of the West Coast Conference, are led by head coach Kelly Graves, in his 13th season at the school. The Zags are playing most of their home games at the McCarthey Athletic Center on the university campus in Spokane, Washington.

Before the Season
The Zags were picked to finish second in the WCC Pre-Season poll behind BYU.

Roster

Schedule

|-
!colspan=9 style="background:#002469; color:#FF0000;"| Exhibition

|-
!colspan=9 style="background:#002469; color:#FF0000;"| Regular Season

|-
!colspan=9 style="background:#FF0000; color:#002469;"| 2013 West Coast Conference women's basketball tournament

|-
!colspan=9 style="background:#FF0000; color:#002469;"| 2013 NCAA Division I women's basketball tournament

Rankings

References

Gonzaga
Gonzaga Bulldogs women's basketball seasons
Gonzaga
Gonzaga Bulldogs men's basketball
Gonzaga Bulldogs men's basketball